The CR200J Fuxing ( "Rejuvenation") is a Chinese higher-speed trainset consisting of a power car paired with unpowered passenger cars operated by China Railway. It is the slowest member of the Fuxing series. The train was jointly designed and produced by six companies under CRRC. 

These units are nicknamed Green EMUs or Hulk by the Chinese media, or "trash cans" among the railfan community due to its appearance.

Design and development

The development of CR200J is initiated by China Railway Corporation to create an affordable, economical, efficient higher-speed rail. The development started on 28 August 2015. First prototype started testing on 27 April 2017. Multiple trainset was sent to China Railway Chengdu Group for dynamic test on Chengdu–Chongqing railway, Chongqing–Lanzhou railway, and Chongqing–Guiyang high-speed railway between 17 December 2017 and 4 January 2018. There're multiple variants of CR200J series made by different subsidiaries of the state-owned China Railway, and these variants are required to follow the China Standardized EMU design philosophy, thus ensuring every variants of CR200J can be compatible to each other. Another round of testing was finished on 5 August 2018. On 5 January 2019, China Railway announced several new service lines, and CR200J was formally put into service.

CR200J shares similar transmission and motor system with other Fuxing series trainset despite the lower operating speed. All CR200J trainset is painted in green colors, reminiscent of China's pervious generation green-skinned train. The interior design follows the design language of CR400 Fuxing EMU trains, and it's fitted with individual power outlet, Wi-Fi connection, and larger legroom.

On Sichuan–Tibet railway, the plateau variant of China Railway CR200J was used. It's a type of bi-mode locomotive specifically designed for plateau operations with weather resistance. A combination of diffusion and distributed oxygen systems are installed to help alleviate altitude sickness for passengers on the trip.

Variant
FXD1-J：Electric locomotive manufactured by CRRC Zhuzhou Locomotive and CRRC Datong.
FXD3-J：Electric locomotive manufactured by CRRC Dalian.
HXD1D-J：Electro-diesel (bi-mode) locomotive manufactured by CRRC Zhuzhou Locomotive for plateau operation.
FXN3-J：Electro-diesel (bi-mode) locomotive manufactured by CRRC Dalian for plateau operation.
25TB coaches: Specially designed 25T coaches with driver-controlled doors.

Equipment issues
In the initial operation period, the CR200J variant manufactured by CRRC Dalian had a high rate of failure. A malfunction in the engine system caused the train to slow down and stop. Out of the 23 EMUs produced by CRRC Dalian, 12 of them have broken down before 1 June 2019. According to a China Business Journal, the maintenance department of the manufacturer was held accountable for the failures. In response, CRRC Dalian cut salaries by 20 percent and recalled their trainset for repair and upgrade.

Gallery

See also
 Fuxing (train)
 China Railway DJJ1
 China Star
 China Railway DDJ1
 E1000 series

References

CRRC multiple units
Electric multiple units with locomotive-like power cars
High-speed trains of China